In thermodynamics, the enthalpy of mixing (also heat of mixing and excess enthalpy) is the enthalpy liberated or absorbed from a substance upon mixing. When a substance or compound is combined with any other substance or compound, the enthalpy of mixing is the consequence of the new interactions between the two substances or compounds. This enthalpy, if released exothermically, can in an extreme case cause an explosion.

Enthalpy of mixing can often be ignored in calculations for mixtures where other heat terms exist, or in cases where the mixture is ideal. The sign convention is the same as for enthalpy of reaction: when the enthalpy of mixing is positive, mixing is endothermic, while negative enthalpy of mixing signifies exothermic mixing. In ideal mixtures, the enthalpy of mixing is null. In non-ideal mixtures, the thermodynamic activity of each component is different from its concentration by multiplying with the activity coefficient.

One approximation for calculating the heat of mixing is Flory–Huggins solution theory for polymer solutions.

Formal definition 
For a liquid, enthalpy of mixing can be defined as follows

Where:
 H(mixture) is the total enthalpy of the system after mixing
 ΔHmix is the enthalpy of mixing
 xi is the mole fraction of component i in the system
 Hi is the enthalpy of pure i
Enthalpy of mixing can also be defined using Gibbs free energy of mixing

However, Gibbs free energy of mixing and entropy of mixing tend to be more difficult to determine experimentally. As such, enthalpy of mixing tends to be determined experimentally in order to calculate entropy of mixing, rather than the reverse.

Enthalpy of mixing is defined exclusively for the continuum regime, which excludes molecular-scale effects (However, first-principles calculations have been made for some metal-alloy systems such as Al-Co-Cr or β-Ti).

When two substances are mixed the resulting enthalpy is not an addition of the pure component enthalpies, unless the substances form an ideal mixture. The interactions between each set of molecules determines the final change in enthalpy. For example, when compound “x” has a strong attractive interaction with compound “y” the resulting enthalpy is exothermic. In the case of alcohol and its interactions with a hydrocarbon, the alcohol molecule participates in hydrogen bonding with other alcohol molecules, and these hydrogen bonding interactions are much stronger than alcohol-hydrocarbon interactions, which results in an endothermic heat of mixing.

Calculations
Enthalpy of mixing is often calculated experimentally using calorimetry methods. A bomb calorimeter is created to be an isolated system. With an insulated frame and a reaction chamber, a bomb calorimeter is used to transfer heat of a reaction or mixing into surrounding water which is then calculated for temperature. A typical solution would use the equation  (derived from the definition above) in conjunction  experimentally determined total-mixture enthalpies and tabulated pure species enthalpies, the difference being equal to enthalpy of mixing.

More complex models, such as the Flory-Huggins and UNIFAC models, allow prediction of enthalpies of mixing. Flory-Huggins is useful in calculating enthalpies of mixing for polymeric mixtures and considers a system from a multiplicity perspective.

Calculations of organic enthalpies of mixing can be made by modifying UNIFAC using the equations 
 
 
 
Where:
  = liquid mole fraction of i
  = partial molar excess enthalpy of i
  = number of groups of type k in i
  = excess enthalpy of group k
  = excess enthalpy of group k in pure i
  = area parameter of group k
  = area fraction of group m
  = mole fraction of group m in the mixture
 
 
  = Temperature dependent coordination number
It can be seen that prediction of enthalpy of mixing is incredibly complex and requires a plethora of system variables to be known. This explains why enthalpy of mixing is typically experimentally determined.

Relation to the Gibbs free energy of mixing
The excess Gibbs free energy of mixing can be related to the enthalpy of mixing by the ușe of the Gibbs-Helmholtz equation:

or equivalently 

In these equations, the excess and total enthalpies of mixing are equal because the ideal enthalpy of mixing is zero. This is not true for the corresponding Gibbs free energies however.

Ideal and regular mixtures 

An ideal mixture is any in which the arithmetic mean (with respect to mole fraction) of the two pure substances is the same as that of the final mixture. Among other important thermodynamic simplifications, this means that enthalpy of mixing is zero: . Any gas that follows the ideal gas law can be assumed to mix ideally, as can hydrocarbons and liquids with similar molecular interactions and properties.

A regular solution or mixture has a non-zero enthalpy of mixing with an ideal entropy of mixing.

Mixing binary mixtures to form ternary mixtures
The heat of mixing for binary mixtures to form ternary one can be expressed as a function of mixing ratios of binary mixtures:

Intermolecular forces
Intermolecular forces are the main constituent of changes in the enthalpy of a mixture. Stronger attractive forces between the mixed molecules, such as hydrogen-bonding, induced-dipole, and dipole-dipole interactions result in a lower enthalpy of the mixture and a release of heat. If strong interactions only exist between like-molecules, such as H-bonds between water in a water-hexane solution, the mixture will have a higher total enthalpy and absorb heat.

See also 
Apparent molar property
Enthalpy
Enthalpy change of solution
Excess molar quantity
Entropy of mixing
Calorimetry
Miedema's Model

References

External links
Can. J. Chem. Eng. Duran Kaliaguine

Enthalpy